Lili is the debut album by violinist/vocalist Lili Haydn. It was released in 1997 by Atlantic Records.

Track listing
 Stranger (Lili Haydn, Matt Sherrod, Lotus Weinstock) 4:58
 Someday (Haydn, Glen Ballard) 4:01
 Real (Haydn, Sherrod) 4:04
 Salome (Haydn, Corky James) 3:05
 Take Somebody Home (Haydn, Peter Rafelson) 4:37
 Faithful One (Haydn, Jeffrey Connor) 4:30
 Baby (Haydn, James) 5:27
 Mama (Haydn) 5:03
 Daddy (Haydn) 4:56
 Wants Deep (Haydn) 6:25

Musicians
vocals, Violin - Lili Haydn
Cello - Gerri Sutyak
Guitar - George Nakas, Frankie Blue, Corky James
Bass - Jeffrey Connor
drums - Toss Panos
keyboards, CS80, percussion - Harleigh Kibbee
Produced by Lili Haydn except 6 produced by Lili Haydn & Jeffrey Connor

1997 debut albums
Atlantic Records albums
Lili Haydn albums